is the third single by Bump of Chicken. The title track is from the album Jupiter. "Tentai Kansoku" was used as the second ending theme for Teasing Master Takagi-san: The Movie (2022), covered by the main character's voice actor, Takahashi Rie. A parody of this song was sung by Tadano from Komi Can't Communicate (2021).

Track listing
All tracks written by Fujiwara Motoo except track 3.

"H・I・R・O・W・A・K・I" (Hidden track)

Personnel
Fujiwara Motoo — Guitar, vocals
Masukawa Hiroaki — Guitar
Naoi Yoshifumi — Bass
Masu Hideo — Drums

Chart performance

Certifications

References

External links
天体観測 on the official Bump of Chicken website.

2001 singles
Bump of Chicken songs
2001 songs
Toy's Factory singles